, the Georgian Orthodox Church is subdivided into fifty eparchies:

In Georgia

Elsewhere

See also 

 Eparchies and Metropolitanates of the Russian Orthodox Church
 Eparchies of the Romanian Orthodox Church
 Eparchies of the Serbian Orthodox Church
 List of Catholic dioceses (structured view)

References 

 Official website of the Georgian Orthodox Church
 Unofficial website of Georgian Orthodoxy 
 
Georgia
Religious sees of the Georgian Orthodox Church
Georgian Orthodox Church
Georgia (country) religion-related lists